Peñasco Elementary School may refer to:
 Peñasco Elementary School - Chaves County (near Hope), New Mexico - Artesia Public Schools
 Peñasco Elementary School - Peñasco, New Mexico - Peñasco Independent School District